Li Chuanmin (born ) is a Chinese male  track cyclist, riding for the national team. He competed in the team pursuit event at the 2010 UCI Track Cycling World Championships.

References

External links
 Profile at cyclingarchives.com

1988 births
Living people
Chinese track cyclists
Chinese male cyclists
Place of birth missing (living people)
Cyclists at the 2010 Asian Games
Asian Games competitors for China
21st-century Chinese people